Pierre Mazior was a French boxer. He competed in the men's bantamweight event at the 1908 Summer Olympics.

References

Year of birth missing
Year of death missing
French male boxers
Olympic boxers of France
Boxers at the 1908 Summer Olympics
Place of birth missing
Bantamweight boxers